Kusch is a German surname. Notable people with the surname include:

Frank Kusch (born 1959), American historian
Garret Kusch (born 1973), Canadian soccer player
Martin Kusch (born 1959), German philosopher
Polykarp Kusch (1911–1993), German-American physicist
Uli Kusch (born 1967), German drummer
Walter Kusch (born 1954), German swimmer

See also
Petra Kusch-Lück (born 1948), German singer

German-language surnames